Neanderthal anatomy differed from modern humans in that they had a more robust build and distinctive morphological features, especially on the cranium, which gradually accumulated more derived aspects, particularly in certain isolated geographic regions. This robust build was an effective adaptation for Neanderthals, as they lived in the cold environments of Europe. In which they also had to operate in Europe's dense forest landscape that was extremely different from the environments of the African grassland plains that Homo sapiens adapted to with a different anatomical build.

A 2007 genetic study suggested some Neanderthals may have had red hair.

Neanderthal teeth also serve as a point of recognition in their anatomy. This is because Neanderthal teeth illustrate non-primitive accounts, and different frequencies when in comparison to modern humans. The research behind Neanderthal teeth morphology shows that it is a unique characteristic and evolutionary trait specifically only found within Neanderthals.

Distinguishing physical traits

The magnitude of autapomorphic traits in specimens differ in time. In the latest specimens, autapomorphy is unclear.

The following is a list of physical traits that distinguish Neanderthals from modern humans. However, not all of them distinguish specific Neanderthal populations from various geographic areas, evolutionary periods, or other extinct humans. Also, many of these traits are present in modern humans to varying extent due to both archaic admixture and the retention of ancestral hominid traits shared with Neanderthals and other archaic humans. Nothing is certain (from unearthed bones) about the shape of soft parts such as eyes, ears, and lips of Neanderthals.

While the structure of the head and face were not very far removed from those of modern humans, there were still quite noticeable differences. Notably the neanderthal head is much longer, with a more pronounced facial front. The Neanderthal chin and forehead sloped backwards and the nose region protruded forward more than in modern humans. The common shapes of the nose are not known but it was more protrusive and large than modern humans especially in the passageways, allowing them to use energy much more efficiently. The brain space of the skull, and so most likely the brain itself, were larger than in modern humans.

When comparing traits to worldwide average present day human traits in Neanderthal specimens, the following traits are distinguished. The magnitude on particular trait changes with 300,000 years timeline. The large number of classic Neanderthal traits is significant because some examples of paleolithic and even modern Homo sapiens may sometimes show one or even a few of these traits, but not most or all of them at the same time.

In October 2018, scientists announced the 3-D virtual reconstruction, for the first time, of a Neanderthal rib cage, which may help researchers better understand how this ancient human species moved and breathed.

In February 2019, scientists reported evidence that Neanderthals walked upright much like modern humans.

Cranial
Sloping forehead
Suprainiac fossa, a groove above the inion
Occipital bun, a protuberance of the occipital bone, which looks like a hair knot
Projecting mid-face (midsagittal prognathism)
Projecting jaws (maxillary and mandibular prognathism)
Less neotenized skull than of a majority of modern humans
Low, elongated skull with flat lambdoid region
Broad cranial vault with "en bombe" parietal morphology
A flat basicranium
Supraorbital ridge, a prominent, trabecular (spongy) brow ridge
 cranial capacity (modern human: 1425 cm3)
Lack of a protruding chin (mental protuberance; although later specimens possess a slight protuberance)
Crest on the mastoid process behind the ear opening
No groove on canine teeth
A retromolar space posterior to the third molar
Broad nose
Bony projections on the sides of the nasal opening, projecting nose
Distinctive shape of the bony labyrinth in the ear
Larger mental foramen in mandible for facial blood supply
Sub-cranial
Considerably more robust, stronger build
Long clavicles (however, Neanderthal clavicles are not relatively long and are proportionately similar to those of modern humans)
Broad shoulders and pelvis
Large, wide shoulder blades
Broad chest
Barrel-shaped or bell-shaped rib cage and no waist (unclear and debated)
More laterally curved radius with a radial tuberosity placed more medially, a longer radial neck, a more ovoid radial head, and a well-developed interosseous crest.
Curved limbs
On the ulna, the trochlear notch is facing more anteriorly, the brachialis insertion is lower, the mid-shaft is larger, and the shaft is more sinusoidal.
Thick joints
Large hands and feet
Larger round finger tips
Large kneecaps
Thick, bowed shaft of the thigh bones, bowed femur
Short tibiae
Short fibulae
Large calcaneus.
Long, gracile pelvic pubis (superior pubic ramus)

Cold-adapted theory 
Some people thought that the large Neanderthal noses were an adaptation to the cold, but primate and arctic animal studies have shown sinus size reduction in areas of extreme cold rather than enlargement in accordance with Allen's rule. Todd C. Rae summarizes explanations about Neanderthal anatomy as trying to find explanations for the "paradox" that their traits are not cold-adapted. Therefore, Rae concludes that the design of the large and extensive Neanderthal nose was evolved for the hotter climate of the Middle East and went unchanged when the Neanderthals entered Europe. However Neanderthals in Spain date back to 700,000 years, prior to them living in the Middle East. Rae supposes that Neanderthals, due to increased physical activity and a large amount of muscle mass, would have needed increased oxygen uptake.

Levantine Neanderthals had phenotypes significantly more similar to modern humans than European Neanderthals (classic Neanderthals). This may be because of gene flow from early modern humans in the Levantine corridor or the fact that the European Neanderthal phenotype is a specialized climatic adaptation.

European Environment Effects 
While Homo sapiens lived on the open African grassland plains, Neanderthals lived in the densely forested landscapes of Europe. Savanna grasslands compared to forested landscapes are extremely different environments. Looking at Neanderthal anatomy, it is already noted that Neanderthals have shorter legs, particularly in the tibia and fibula leg bones below the knee, compared to Homo sapiens. Neanderthals' adaption to the colder environments of Europe are seen as having shorter legs.

The shorter legs also bring up evidence for other abilities that Neanderthals were better suited for in Europe due to the dense, cold forests. One of these abilities that Neanderthals have for the cold environments of Europe during 2000,000 - 40,000 years ago, is that they have long toes. Along with longer toes, Neanderthals are found to have longer heel bones when compared to Homo sapiens’ heel bones. The Neanderthal anatomy is more suited for the cold environments of Europe, as seen with their longer toes and longer heel bones, because it made them well-suited for hiking, hunting, and even sprinting in the hilly and forested environments that Europe had to offer.

Teeth 
Looking at teeth morphology is important within Neanderthals, because their teeth represent a unique morphology that is a specifically derived trait within their species. When looking at Neanderthals compared to modern humans, or Homo sapiens, Neanderthals have a distinct dental morphology that is unique compared to modern human's dental frequency patterns. Along with this, a Neanderthal's mandibular presents unique characteristics that are different from Homo sapiens. When comparing Neanderthal dental morphology, and their specific characteristics to evolutionary traits, researchers have found that even when compared to Homo erectus, a Neanderthal's mandibular still presents a distinctive dental morphology. This finding conveys that Neanderthal teeth were not primitive renditions, like Homo erectus, but instead signify that Neanderthal teeth were a derived trait within their species. Another study calculated crown creation time, and molar eruption age, and found that standard development variables like cuspal enamel thickness, and long-period line tendencies, are also unique characteristic frequencies within Neanderthals compared to modern humans. In the study's sample size of 90 permanent teeth from 28 different Neanderthals, and 39 permanent teeth from 9 different Homo sapiens fossils, it revealed that Neanderthals have a thinner cuspal enamel that was formed in a shorter amount of time. The scientists found that since Neanderthals had a thinner enamel, it was in relation to having a lower long-period line periodicity and a faster extension rate, which resulted in lower crown creation times.

Neanderthals lived in the cold environments of Europe, so their diet mainly consisted of meat, but recent studies found that some groups of Neanderthals were eating nuts, edible fungus like mushrooms, and moss with no indication of meat. Looking strictly at tooth-based resources for information of a Neanderthal's diet and its effect on the teeth morphology is to look at hardened tooth plaque that contain microscopic remains. Tooth plaque on Neanderthal's teeth represent a meat-heavy diet of wild animals.

Pathology
Within the west Asian and European record, there are five broad groups of pathology or injury noted in Neanderthal skeletons.

Fractures
Neanderthals seemed to suffer a high frequency of fractures, especially common on the ribs (Shanidar IV, La Chapelle-aux-Saints 1 'Old Man'), the femur (La Ferrassie 1), fibulae (La Ferrassie 2 and Tabun 1), spine (Kebara 2) and skull (Shanidar I, Krapina, Sala 1). These fractures are often healed and show little or no sign of infection, suggesting that injured individuals were cared for during times of incapacitation. It has been remarked that Neanderthals showed a frequency of such injuries comparable to that of modern rodeo professionals, showing frequent contact with large, combative mammals. The pattern of fractures, along with the absence of throwing weapons, suggests that they may have hunted by leaping onto their prey and stabbing or even wrestling it to the ground.

Trauma
Particularly related to fractures are cases of trauma seen on many skeletons of Neanderthals. These usually take the form of stab wounds, as seen on Shanidar III, whose lung was probably punctured by a stab wound to the chest between the eighth and ninth ribs. This may have been an intentional attack or merely a hunting accident; either way the man survived for some weeks after his injury before being killed by a rock fall in the Shanidar cave. Other signs of trauma include blows to the head (Shanidar I and IV, Krapina), all of which seemed to have healed, although traces of the scalp wounds are visible on the surface of the skulls.

Degenerative disease
Arthritis was common in the older Neanderthal population, specifically targeting areas of articulation such as the ankle (Shanidar III), spine and hips (La Chapelle-aux-Saints 'Old Man'), arms (La Quina 5, Krapina, Feldhofer) knees, fingers and toes. This is closely related to degenerative joint disease, which can range from normal, use-related degeneration to painful, debilitating restriction of movement and deformity and is seen in varying degree in the Shanidar skeletons (I–IV).

Developmental stress

Two non-specific indicators of stress during development are found in teeth, which record stresses, such as periods of food scarcity or illness, that disrupt normal dental growth. One indicator is enamel hypoplasia, which appears as pits, grooves, or lines in the hard enamel covering of teeth. The other indicator, fluctuating asymmetry, manifests as random departures from symmetry in paired biological structures (such as right and left teeth). Teeth do not grow in size after they form nor do they produce new enamel, so enamel hypoplasia and fluctuating asymmetry provide a permanent record of developmental stresses occurring in infancy and childhood.  A study of 669 Neanderthal crowns showed that 75% of individuals suffered some degree of hypoplasia.  Two studies, compared Neanderthals with the Tigara, coastal whale-hunting people from Point Hope Alaska, finding comparable levels of linear enamel hypoplasia (a specific form of hypoplasia) and higher levels of fluctuating asymmetry in Neanderthals. Estimated stress episode duration from Neanderthal linear enamel hyoplasias suggest that Neandertals experienced stresses lasting from two weeks to up to three months.

Infection
Evidence of infections on Neanderthal skeletons is usually visible in the form of lesions on the bone, which are created by systemic infection on areas closest to the bone. Shanidar I has evidence of the degenerative lesions as does La Ferrassie 1, whose lesions on both femora, tibiae and fibulae are indicative of a systemic infection or carcinoma (malignant tumour/cancer).

Further evidence of infections on Neanderthal anatomy are seen through ear infections due to the fact that their Eustachian tubes are flat. In comparison to modern humans, when infants grow up to become adults their Eustachian tubes become angled to allow for easy drainage of the ear and for bacteria to not grow in the ear. Based on evidence from Pagano, Márquez, and Laitman's study, Neanderthal’s ear canals never angled down when they aged, as compared to modern human adults, so their Eustachian tubes remained flat throughout their childhood and adulthood. As a result of this, Neanderthals were more prone to ear infections which can even cause hearing loss. Today, Neanderthal ear infections are typically seen in their anatomy by bone growths on their skulls that were caused by the ear infection commonly known as “swimmer’s ear.” A study from Trinkaus, Samsel, and Villotte's research article found that 48% of their 77 Neanderthal skull sample size showed that there were bone growths on the skulls to indicate the influence of “swimmer’s ear” infection.

Childhood
Neanderthal children may have grown faster than modern human children. Modern humans have the slowest body growth of any mammal during childhood (the period between infancy and puberty) with lack of growth during this period being made up later in an adolescent growth spurt. The possibility that Neanderthal childhood growth was different was first raised in 1928 by the excavators of the Mousterian rock-shelter of a Neanderthal juvenile. Arthur Keith in 1931 wrote, "Apparently Neanderthal children assumed the appearances of maturity at an earlier age than modern children." The rate of body maturation can be inferred by comparing the maturity of a juvenile's fossil remains and the estimated age of death.
The age at which juveniles can be indirectly inferred from their tooth morphology, development and emergence. This has been argued to both support and question the existence of a maturation difference between Neanderthals and modern humans. Since 2007, tooth age can be directly calculated using the noninvasive imaging of growth patterns in tooth enamel by means of x-ray synchrotron microtomography.

This research supports the occurrence of much more rapid physical development in Neanderthals than in modern human children. The x-ray synchrotron microtomography study of early H. sapiens sapiens argues that this difference existed between the two species as far back as 160,000 years before present.

More recent research, published in September 2017 and based on a more complete skeleton of a Neanderthal juvenile (7.7 years old) found in a 49,000-year-old site in Northern Spain, indicates that Neanderthal children actually grew at a similar rate to modern humans. Researchers were able to examine dental, cranial, and postcranial material, allowing the assessment of dental and skeletal maturation with age. In fact the main difference between Neandertals and modern humans was reported in the vertebral column. Several features also indicated ongoing brain growth. It was observed that the pattern of vertebral maturation and extended brain growth might reflect the broad Neanderthal body form and physiology, rather than a fundamental difference in the overall pace of growth in Neanderthals compared to modern humans.

Footnotes

External links 

Anatomy
Ancient DNA (human)
Human anatomy